The Journal of Exposure Science and Environmental Epidemiology (JESEE) is a peer-reviewed scientific journal focused on exposure science for professionals in a wide range of environmental and public health disciplines. It was established in 1991 as the Journal of Exposure Analysis and Environmental Epidemiology and obtained its current name in 2006. The Journal of Exposure Science and Environmental Epidemiology (JESEE) is the official journal of the International Society of Exposure Science (ISES).  It is published in 6 issues per year in print and online by Springer Nature and the editor-in-chief is Elaine A. Cohen Hubal. According to the Journal Citation Reports, Journal of Exposure Science and Environmental Epidemiology has a 2020 impact factor of 5.563, ranking it 56th out of 274 in the category Environmental Sciences.

References

External links 
 
ISES website

Toxicology journals
Nature Research academic journals
Bimonthly journals
Epidemiology journals
English-language journals
Publications established in 1991
Environmental health journals